Alexander "Ander" Monro (born September 6, 1981) is a Canadian rugby union footballer. He previously played for the Edinburgh Gunners, Waterloo R.F.C. and Colorno Rugby Club in Italy. He currently plays club rugby for Castaway Wanderers and plays with the Ontario Blues in the Canadian Rugby Championship.  He is also a member of the Canadian national rugby team.

Ander was born in North York, Ontario, Canada. He is the grandson of Hector Monro, Baron Monro of Langholm, the former President of the Scottish Rugby Union. He was educated at Glenalmond College where he captained the 1st XV in 2000. Ander then went on to study at the University of Edinburgh.

On July 8, 2011, it was announced that Monro will represent Canada at the 2011 Rugby World Cup.

As of September 18, 2011, Monro has scored 49 points with 28 caps for Canada. These points consist of 2 tries, 6 conversions, 6 penalties and 3 drop goals.

External links 
Edinburgh Rugby
Celtic League Stats

References

1981 births
Canada international rugby union players
Canadian people of Scottish descent
Canadian rugby union players
Edinburgh Rugby players
Living people
Rugby football people from Ontario
Sportspeople from North York
Waterloo R.F.C. players
People educated at Glenalmond College
Alumni of the University of Edinburgh
Canadian expatriate rugby union players
Expatriate rugby union players in Scotland
Expatriate rugby union players in England
Canadian expatriate sportspeople in England
German expatriate sportspeople in Scotland
Rugby union fly-halves